Pugsley is a surname. Notable people with the surname include:

Albert Pugsley (1910–2002)
Andrew Pugsley (born 1978)
Christopher Pugsley, New Zealand military historian
Cornelius Amory Pugsley (1850–1936)
Jacob J. Pugsley (1838–1920), American republican representative
John Pugsley (1934–2011)
Joseph Pugsley (1885–1976)
William H. Pugsley (1851–1933)
William Pugsley (1850–1925)
Rear-Admiral Anthony Follett Pugsley (1901-1990)

See also
Pugsley Addams, character in Addams family
Pugsley's Creek, tributary of Westchester Creek